The Cravath System is a set of business management principles first developed at Cravath, Swaine & Moore in the early 20th century. John Oller, author of White Shoe, credits Paul Drennan Cravath with creating the model in the early 20th century which was adopted by virtually all white-shoe law firms, 50 years before the phrase white shoe came into popular use. The Cravath System has been adopted by many leading law firms, consulting agencies, and investment banks in the United States.

Components
Paul Cravath built a reputation handling complex lawsuits for the new electrical industry. Devising the Cravath System, he enlarged the law office, and also professionalised it by establishing full-time librarians, a recruiting system focused solely on the highest-ranked law schools, and partners who specialized. Robert Swaine describes the fundamentals of the Cravath System in the beginning of Volume 2 of the history of the Cravath firm. These include:

 Recruiting staffPaul Cravath sought to hire only the "best of the best", and primarily looked to Harvard, Yale, and Columbia law schools for candidates. Graduates were expected to be members of the Phi Beta Kappa/Beta Gamma Sigma system, and to have served as editors of their respective school's law review. A graduate from a university outside of the top five was expected to be, minimally, the equivalent of a "B" student at Harvard or Columbia over time. Distinctly, only new law graduates or those who had served as clerks after law school were to be hired, except in rare circumstances, to avoid previously developed habits, outside the Cravath System, coming to the firm's culture.
 Training staffAssociates would be assigned to a partner for typically 18 months, or less, where they would learn to break down large tasks into manageable pieces to lead. The view was that they would serve as apprentices of the partner's practice, and train on the job under close supervision and guidance.
 CompensationThe system practices lockstep compensation. Early law firm hiring practices paid the associates nothing, except what they could bring in for themselves. By 1910, the Cravath was one of the first to hire incoming lawyers on a salary. Since Cravath preferred to hire the best and remunerate them very well, this led to wide disparities in starting salaries in the legal industry. Collusion among law firms and schools led to uniform starting salaries across law firms from the end of World War I until World War II, but this stopped once the top law firms salaries reached parity soon after.
 TenureGenerally, only partners may have permanent employment at the firm, and as long as an associate was deemed worthy of promotion, they may stay; those who were not suitable for promotion were dismissed in a strictly enforced "up or out" staffing policy.
 Choosing partnersUnless there is some exceptional need for expertise unavailable within the firm, partners should be chosen and promoted only from within the office.
 Interests outside the firmPartners and associates may not have business interests outside the firm. Charitable, educational and artistic interests are permitted with permission from the senior partner. There are no part time associates and partners, and all business in the office is company business and not individual.
 Relationships of the partnersPartners are expected to work with each other; silos and cliques are to be strictly avoided so as to foster trust and a firmwide esprit de corps.
 Scope of the practiceCravath handled predominantly civil law matters in the early years; the majority of firms adopting this system are also civil law firms.
 InfluenceThe firm would avoid lobbying, or currying favors with politicians in the state or national capital. The firm would stick with skill and diligence in applying the law.
 ManagementCravath believed that a firm must have strong executive direction, led by the senior partner who was elected by the partnership for a limited term.

See also
 History of the American legal profession
 Law firm

References 

Recruitment
Training
Business models
Cravath, Swaine & Moore